The Securities Investor Protection Act of 1970, Public Law No. 91-598, 84 Stat. 1636 (Dec. 30, 1970), codified at  through , established the Securities Investor Protection Corporation (SIPC). Most brokers and dealers registered under the Securities Exchange Act of 1934 are required to be members of the SIPC.

The SIPC maintains a fund that is intended to protect investors against the misappropriation of their funds and of most types of securities in the event of the failure of their broker.

External links
 Securities Investor Protection Act of 1970 (PDF/details) as amended in the GPO Statute Compilations collection

1970 in law
United States federal securities legislation